Filmon may refer to:

 FilmOn, internet television provider
 Filmon Ghirmai (born 1979), long-distance runner
 Filmon Tseqay, footballer
 Gary Filmon, (born 1942), politician